KLOQ can mean:

 KLOQ-FM, a Californian FM radio station
 KLOQ (band), a British electronic rock band